Jessica Wuetschner (born 28 April 1992) is an Australian rules footballer who currently plays for Essendon, and previously played for the Brisbane Lions, in the AFL Women's (AFLW) competition.

Early life
Born in Hobart, Wuetschner first formally played football at age 16 and quickly went on to be a standout performer in the Tasmanian Women's League for Clarence Football Club. From 2011 to 2013, she won both the league's leading goal-kicker award and the league's best and fairest award each year, while her team achieved a rare premiership three-peat.

Wuetschner also proved to be a notable talent across various other sports while growing up, representing her state in hockey at underage level, and winning the best and fairest award in the Cricket Tasmania Premier League women's competition for both the 2010–11 and 2011–12 seasons. 

In 2014, Wuetschner moved to Perth and began playing for East Fremantle in the West Australian Women's Football League (WAWFL). 

In 2015, Wuetschner was part of an international exchange that saw her play Australian rules in the United States with the Boston Lady Demons in the USAFLW playing at the 2015 USAFL National Championships.

AFL Women's career
She made her debut in the Lions' inaugural game against  at Casey Fields on 5 February 2017. At the end of the season, she was listed in the 40-player All-Australian squad.

In 2018, Wuetschner placed second behind Brooke Lochland in the league goal-kicking award, finishing the regular season with 11 goals. Her standout year as a forward was rewarded with selection in the All-Australian team. She re-signed with the Lions for the following season, having rejected offers from expansion club .

Brisbane slumped to a 2–5 win–loss record in 2019, however Wuetschner still managed eight goals from seven matches—including a three-goal performance in her club's two-point round one victory against —and earned a third All-Australian nomination.

Two weeks before the beginning of the 2020 season, Wuetschner was struck by lightning while working as a stevedore at the Port of Brisbane. She avoided serious injury from the traumatic incident, but struggled with her mental health in the subsequent months and considered retiring from football. Having missed the opening month of the 2021 season, Wuetschner re-established herself as a key fixture of Brisbane's line-up as the team went on to win their first premiership. In the 18-point Grand Final victory against Adelaide at Adelaide Oval, she rose to the occasion in typical fashion, kicking two goals off her "beautiful" left foot.

After a five-disposal game against  in round four of the 2022 season, Wuetschner was omitted from the Brisbane line-up. Later in the season, she announced a decision to take time away from AFLW in order to focus on her mental health. In a club press release, the Brisbane Lions stated they would "continue to provide Jess with our full support". In May 2022, Wuetschner was delisted by Brisbane. The following month, she was signed by expansion club Essendon as a delisted free agent.

Statistics 
Statistics correct to the end of 2022 season.

|- style="background:#EAEAEA"
| scope="row" text-align:center | 2017
|
| 23 || 8 || 5 || 3 || 44 || 17 || 61 || 16 || 23 || 0.6 || 0.4 || 5.5 || 2.1 || 7.6 || 2.0 || 2.9 || 0
|-
| scope="row" text-align:center | 2018
|
| 23 || 8 || bgcolor="b7e718" | 13 || 6 || 61 || 17 || 78 || 19 || 23 || bgcolor="b7e718" | 1.6 || 0.8 || 7.6 || 2.1 || 9.8 || 2.4 || 2.9 || 3
|- style="background:#EAEAEA"
| scope="row" text-align:center | 2019
|
| 23 || 7 || 8 || 6 || 53 || 23 || 76 || 19 || 15 || 1.1 || 0.9 || 7.6 || 3.3 || 10.9 || 2.7 || 2.1 || 0
|-
| scope="row" text-align:center | 2020
|
| 23 || 5 || 3 || 2 || 30 || 15 || 45 || 12 || 12 || 0.6 || 0.4 || 6.0 || 3.0 || 9.0 || 2.4 || 2.4 || 0
|- style="background:#EAEAEA"
| scope="row" text-align:center | 2021
|
| 23 || 7 || 6 || 6 || 35 || 17 || 52 || 16 || 15 || 0.9 || 0.9 || 5.0 || 2.4 || 7.4 || 2.3 || 2.1 || 0
|-
| scope="row" text-align:center | 2022
|
| 23 || 3 || 2 || 2 || 18 || 5 || 23 || 6 || 8 || 0.7 || 0.7 || 6.0 || 1.7 || 7.7 || 2.0 || 2.7 || 0
|- class="sortbottom"
! colspan=3| Career
! 38
! 37
! 25
! 241
! 93
! 334
! 88
! 96
! 1.0
! 0.7
! 6.3
! 2.4
! 8.8
! 2.3
! 2.5
! 3
|}

References

External links

1992 births
Living people
Australian rules footballers from Hobart
Sportswomen from Tasmania
Brisbane Lions (AFLW) players
All-Australians (AFL Women's)
Essendon Football Club (AFLW) players